Swangey Fen, Attleborough is a  biological Site of Special Scientific Interest south-west of Attleborough in Norfolk. It is part of the Norfolk Valley Fens Special Area of Conservation.

Part of this site is spring fed fen with diverse flora, including grass of Parnassus, marsh helleborine and several rare mosses. The fen is surrounded by wet woodland and grassland.

Much of this site is private but there is public access to an area formerly managed by the Norfolk Wildlife Trust off Fen Street

References

Sites of Special Scientific Interest in Norfolk